Viktar Aliaksandravich Vabishchevich (born March 22, 1989) is a Belarusian swimmer, who specialized in breaststroke events. He posted a Belarusian record time of 28.03 seconds in the prelims of the men's 50 m breaststroke at the 2012 European Aquatics Championships in Debrecen, Hungary. He also won a bronze medal in the same event at the 2007 European Junior Swimming Championships in Antwerp, Belgium, clocking at 28.62 seconds.

Vabishchevich competed for Belarus in two swimming events at the 2008 Summer Olympics in Beijing. Leading up to the Games, he won the 100 m breaststroke race with a scintillating 1:02.19 to dip beneath a FINA B-cut (1:03.72) at the Belarus Open Championships in his native Brest. In the 100 m breaststroke, Vabishchevich wound up last and forty-ninth overall to round out the field in heat five with 1:03.29, failing to advance to the semifinals. Vabishchevich also participated in the 4 × 100 m medley relay, along with his teammates Pavel Sankovich, Yauheni Lazuka, and 2004 Olympian Stanislau Neviarouski. Swimming the breaststroke leg, Vabishchevich recorded a split in 1:01.89, but the Belarusian team had to settle for last place with a final time of 3:39.39.

References

External links
NBC 2008 Olympics profile

1989 births
Living people
Belarusian male swimmers
Olympic swimmers of Belarus
Swimmers at the 2008 Summer Olympics
Male breaststroke swimmers
Sportspeople from Brest, Belarus